Zhazira Nurimbetova (born 7 October 1991 in Kentau) is a Kazakh beauty pageant titleholder who was crowned Miss Kazakhstan 2012.

Pageantry

Miss Kazakhstan 2012
After becoming Miss Shymkent, Nurimbetova was crowned Miss Kazakhstan 2012 at the Palace of Independence in Astana on 8 December 2012. Aygerim Kozhakanova, winner of the Miss Almaty pageant, represented Kazakhstan at the Miss Universe 2013 pageant in Moscow due to Nurimbetova's duties to crown the new Miss Kazakhstan on the same day.

References

External links
Official Miss Kazakhstan website

1991 births
Living people
People from Kentau
Kazakhstani beauty pageant winners
Miss Kazakhstan winners